The 2017–18 season was Hibernian's (Hibs) first season of play back in the top league of Scottish football the Scottish Premiership, having been promoted from the Scottish Championship at the end of the 2016–17 season. They last played in the Scottish Premiership during the 2013–14 season. Hibs reached the semi-final of the League Cup, where they lost 4–2 to holders Celtic. In the Scottish Cup, Hibs lost 1–0 to Edinburgh derby rivals Hearts in the fourth round (last 32). Hibs challenged for a second-place finish in the league, but eventually finished in fourth.

Results and fixtures

Friendlies

Scottish Premiership

League Cup

Matches

Scottish Cup

Player statistics
During the 2017–18 season, Hibs have used twenty-nine different players in competitive games. The table below shows the number of appearances and goals scored by each player. David Gray is club captain for the season.

{| class="wikitable" style="font-size: 100%; text-align: center;"
|-
! style="background:#008000; color:white; width:30px;" rowspan="2" | Number
! style="background:#008000; color:white; width:10%;" rowspan="2" | Position
! style="background:#008000; color:white; width:10%;" rowspan="2" | Nation
! style="background:#008000; color:white; width:20%;" rowspan="2" | Name
! style="background:#008000; color:white;" colspan="2" | Totals
! style="background:#008000; color:white;" colspan="2" | Premiership
! style="background:#008000; color:white;" colspan="2" | League Cup
! style="background:#008000; color:white;" colspan="2" | Scottish Cup
|-
! style="background:#008000; color:white; width:60px;" |Apps
! style="background:#008000; color:white; width:60px;" |Goals
! style="background:#008000; color:white; width:60px;" |Apps
! style="background:#008000; color:white; width:60px;" |Goals
! style="background:#008000; color:white; width:60px;" |Apps
! style="background:#008000; color:white; width:60px;" |Goals
! style="background:#008000; color:white; width:60px;" |Apps
! style="background:#008000; color:white; width:60px;" |Goals
|-

Disciplinary record

Goal Scorers
Last updated 31 March 2018

Club statistics

League table

Division summary

League Cup group table

Management statistics

Transfers

Players in

Players out

Loans in

Loans out

See also
List of Hibernian F.C. seasons

Notes

References

2017-18
Scottish football clubs 2017–18 season